Lambertus Doedes (4 July 1878 in Zutphen – 17 May 1955 in The Hague) was a sailor from the Netherlands, who represented his native country at the 1928 Summer Olympics in Amsterdam. Doedes, as crewmember on the Dutch 8 Metre Hollandia, took the 2nd place with helmsman Johannes van Hoolwerff and fellow crew members: Henk Kersken, Cornelis van Staveren, Gerard de Vries Lentsch and Maarten de Wit.

Sources
 
 
 

1878 births
1955 deaths
People from Zutphen
Sportspeople from Gelderland
Dutch male sailors (sport)
Sailors at the 1928 Summer Olympics – 8 Metre
Olympic sailors of the Netherlands
Medalists at the 1928 Summer Olympics
Olympic medalists in sailing
Olympic silver medalists for the Netherlands